Robinson Branch may refer to:

Robinson Branch (Kansas), a stream in Bourbon County, Kansas, United States
Robinson Branch (Missouri), a stream in Vernon County, Missouri, United States